Pandem  is a 2005 Indian Telugu-language romantic comedy film produced by Valluripally Ramesh Babu under the Maharshi Cinema banner and directed by Sabapathy Dekshinamurthy in his Telugu debut. It stars Jagapati Babu, Kalyani and music composed by Chakri. It was dubbed into Hindi as Mera Challenge.

Plot
The film begins in a village where Seenu is a slacker whom the public considers as hopeless. Lingaraju is its venomous president who has been unanimously elected for the past 25 years and behested on the village. Seeta a native returned after several years as a school teacher in the same town. Seenu & Seeta are childhood friends and he falls for her in the first instance itself. From there, he plays several efforts to gain her love which ends humorously but to avail. So, he directly proceeds to proclaim his love. At that point, Seenu discovers Seeta's intention and qualities that her spouse should hold. Firstly, an upright altruistic may not be a millionaire but be praised by everyone. Above all, he must be of a higher rank than her. Listening to it, Seenu backs and determines to acquire the eligibility which Seeta aspires. 

Meanwhile, Lingaraju ploys a revolting deal with a few industrialists to construct a hazardous factory in the village. Simultaneously, it's time for elections and Lingaraju is under brash given the absence of opposition. Here, Seenu decides to stand for reaching the heights which Seeta desires and knit her. At the outset, Seenu faces the loathsome knock-back from the public as he is considered a no-hoper. Consequently, he shoots several cheap shots when hostility toward him uprises. During that plight, Seeta boosts his courage, guides him to put the village right, and amend the lifestyles of the people. Moreover, she inquires about the cause behind his deeds when he reveals that to win the heart of a girl but puts off who is she. As well, he asserts to first divulge the girl's whereabouts to her only when the time is right. 

Now Seenu with his wit tactically procures the necessities required for the village which Lingaraju is incapable to satisfy. Including, digging wells, laying roads, allotting houses for the needy, etc. Plus, he serves as domestic to whoever is in trouble and enforces Lingaraju to spend his corrupted earnings for the welfare of the villagers. Step-by-step flourishes and gains the credence & hearts of the public. Spotting it, Lingaraju trembles for severe alarm bells from his industrial partners. Simultaneously, Lingaraju is cognizant that his son Rajesh likes Seeta and also detects Seenu's motive. Whereupon, he ruses by engaging Seeta with Rajesh, which demoralizes Seenu. Despite that, Seenu stands firm and challenges Lingaraju to defeat him. Thus, infuriated Lingaraju backstabs Seenu and warns the villagers not to move forward otherwise all will be mass murdered. 

Yet, they boldly face the danger and safeguard Seenu. Next, everyone pleads with Seenu to withdraw because as of today, they all treasure him. Additionally, they abuse Seeta who is liable for these disputes. Forthwith, Seenu rebukes and dedicates his entire credit to Seeta which molded him as worthy. Overhearing it, Seeta starts adoring him but departs because she is affianced. Presently, The day of the election arrives. During, Lingaraju intrigues by hiding supporters of Seenu and the remaining makes as his favor as they have taken loans from him. Anyhow, Seenu valorously relieves his men and successfully conducts the polling when the two parties are given equal. At last, Seenu triumphs with a postal ballot polled by Seeta who went on election duty to the adjacent village which collapses Lingaraju's domain. Finally, the movie ends on a happy note with the marriage of Seenu & Seeta.

Cast

 Jagapati Babu as Seenu
 Kalyani as Seeta 
 Ramaraju as Lingaraju
 Ahuti Prasad as Satya Murthy
 M. S. Narayana as Surinarayana
 Kondavalasa as Jilla Rambabu
 Krishna Bhagawan as Muriki Appala Naidu
 Sivaji Raja  as Abbulu
 Chinna as RMP Doctor
 Prudhviraj 
 Ravi Varma as Rajesh
 Subbaraya Sharma as Villager
 Sarika Ramchandra Rao as Pamula Narsaiyya 
 Chitram Basha  
 Jeeva as Police Inspector
 Apoorva
 Mahathi as Pankajam
 Drasharamam Saroja as Saroja
 Lavanya
 Shobha Rani
 Sakhi

Soundtrack

Music was composed by Chakri.

Reception 
Idlebrain rated the film 3.25 out of 5 stars and noted that "On the whole, Pandem is a minimum guarantee film which you would never regret watching". Full Hyderabad wrote that "But the script is nowhere near taut, and the individual moments of the film completely undo the potential of the plot".

References

External links 

 

2005 films
2000s Telugu-language films
Indian romantic comedy films
Films scored by Chakri
Films directed by Sabapathy Dekshinamurthy
2005 romantic comedy films